The Army Bureau of Current Affairs (ABCA) as an organisation set up to educate and raise morale amongst British servicemen and servicewomen during World War II.

ABCA pamphlets and publications
The ABCA published two main series of pamphlets War and Current Affairs, both from September 1941 with the former series concluding after Victory in Europe Day in June 1945 and the latter continuing until December 1946.  These pamphlets were published biweekly and usually contained 16 pages, including the front and rear covers.  There are also seems to have been a French-language version of these pamphlets published for Canadian French speaking troops. A completely different series was made for the Middle East but not many come onto the market.

A further printed publication and different approach for discussion was an ABCA issued wall chart for use in barracks etc., of which not many seem to have survived the war.  Last but not least, an ABCA song book was released in 1944 with an introduction by Williams himself.

The details of the War and Current Affair pamphlets are as follows:

1941 WAR
No. 1 : 20 September — News-facts for fighting men
No. 2 : 4 October — News-facts for fighting men
No. 3 : 18 October — News-facts for fighting men
No. 4 : 1 November — News-facts for fighting men
No. 5 : 15 November — News-facts for fighting men
No. 6 : 29 November — News-facts for fighting men
No. 7 : 13 December — News-facts for fighting men
No. 8 : 27 December — News-facts for fighting men

1942 WAR
No. 9 : 10 January — News-facts for fighting men
No. 10 : 24 January — News-facts for fighting men
No. 11 : 7 February — News-facts for fighting men
No. 12 : 21 February — Fifty-five days in Malaya
No. 13 : 7 March — If invasion comes
No. 14 : 21 March — The enemy in the east
No. 15 : 4 April — The mind of a Nazi
No. 16 : 18 April — The Libyan See-saw
No. 17 : 2 May — The German army
No. 18 : 16 May — How Russia fights
No. 19 : 30 May — The Greeks fight on
No. 20 : 13 June — In a desert battle
No. 21 : 27 June — Libya, summer 1942
No. 22 : 11 July — The thrust for Egypt
No. 23 : 25 July — The U.S. Army
No. 24 : 8 August — Guide for Jap invaders
No. 25 : 22 August — The Merchant Navy
No. 26 : 5 September — The Indian Army
No. 27 : 19 September — Life in the R.A.C.
No. 28 : 3 October — Dieppe Summary
No. 29 : 17 October — The British Soldier
No. 30 : 31 October — I didn't think it mattered
No. 31 : 14 November — Where did that one go (RA)
No. 32 : 28 November — The Airborne Forces
No. 33 : 12 December — Desert song
No. 34 : 26 December — Army Food (+ CMP + selection)

1943 WAR
No. 35 : 9 January — The trouble with Italians
No. 36 : 23 January — And what did you see? (RA)
No. 37 : 6 February — Little men, what now?
No. 38 : 22 February — This is the Red Army
No. 39 : 6 March — Battle report (16 p.)
No. 40 : 20 March — Pass the Ammunition (16 p.)
No. 41 : 3 April — "Be Mean and kill 'em"
No. 42 : 17 April — He leads, the others follow
No. 43 : 1 May — Full Supporting Cast
No. 44 : 15 May — Casualty report
No. 45 : 29 May — Operation Diary
No. 46 : 12 June — The Royal Marines
No. 47 : 26 June — The horse's mouth 
No. 48 : 10 July — Enemy: Japan
No. 49 : 24 July — The documents in the case
No. 50 : 7 August — Mediterranean Journey
No. 51 : 21 August — The guards at Mareth
No. 52 : 4 September — A night out in Sicily
No. 53 : 18 September — ATS (progress report)
No. 54 : 2 October — Daylight bombing
No. 55 : 16 October — Coastal Forces
No. 56 : 30 October — Soldiers' Battles
No. 57 : 13 November — All orders faithfully executed (RE)
No. 58 : 27 November — When in Rome
No. 59 : 11 December — Parachuting as a career
No. 60 : 25 December — Thought for food (and part two of Parachuting as a career.)

1944 WAR
No. 61 : 8 January — Seaward watch
No. 62 : 22 January — Frankfurt revisited
No. 63 : 5 February — Recce Corps
No. 64 : 19 February — Strictly G.I.
No. 65 : 4 March — Salerno Diary
No. 66 : 18 March — Louder and Faster (AA)
No. 67 : 1 April — The man overhead
No. 68 : 15 April — Self-preservation (booby traps)
No. 69 : 29 April — One more river
No. 70 : 13 May — The other army
No. 71 : 27 May — Next of kin
No. 72 : 10 June — Up in Arms
No. 73 : 24 June — Preparations (16 p.)
No. 74 : No details available
No. 75 : 5 August — The case against Private Abbott
No. 76 : 19 August — Tiger, tiger, burning bright
No. 77 : 2 September — Two sides of battle
No. 78 : 16 September — The Captain in search of his youth
No. 79 : 14 October — Not only concerned with food
No. 80 : 28 October — Gentlemen, let us not hurry
No. 81 : 11 November — Five years of war
No. 82 : 25 November — Yes, if he has no fingernails
No. 83 : 9 December — Arnhem, part I
No. 84 : 23 December — Arnhem, part II

1945 WAR
No. 85 : 6 January — Look Homeward, Jap
No. 86 : 20 January — Antwerp
No. 88 : 17 February — Riding high
No. 89 : 3 March — The Philippines
No. 90 : 17 March — The Red Army advances
No. 91 : 31 March — Incidental explosion
No. 93 : 28 April — Report (20 p.)
No. 94 : 12 May — Return via Dunkirk
No. 95 : 26 May — From now on (16 p.)
No. 96 : 9 June — The road to Rangoon
No. 97 : 23 June — Swan song

A.B.C.A. series CURRENT AFFAIRS

1941 Current Affairs
No. 1 : 27 September — A background bulletin
No. 2 : 11 October — A background bulletin
No. 3 : 25 October — A background bulletin
No. 4 : 8 November — A background bulletin
No. 5 : 22 November — A background bulletin
No. 6 : 6 December — A background bulletin
No. 7 : 20 December — A background bulletin

1942
No. 8 : 3 January — A background bulletin
No. 9 : 17 January — A background bulletin
No. 10 : 31 January — A background bulletin
No. 11 : 14 February — A background bulletin
No. 12 : 28 February — A background bulletin
No. 13 : 14 March — A background bulletin
No. 14 : 28 March — A background bulletin
No. 15 : 11 April — A background bulletin
No. 16 : 25 April — A background bulletin
No. 17 : 9 May — South Africa and the War
No. 18 : 23 May — Britain's Acres go to War
No. 19 : 6 June — Cripps on India
No. 20 : 20 June — Women at War
No. 21 : 4 July — Hitler's Own War
No. 22 : 18 July — Meet the Americans
No. 23 : 1 August — The British Empire
No. 24 : 15 August — The Chungking Angle
No. 25 : 29 August — The Russian Background
No. 26 : 12 September — Here are the Americans
No. 27 : 26 September — Town Planning
No. 28 : 10 October — What price Victory?
No. 29 : 24 October — Development of Nazism
No. 30 : 7 November — How can we abolish War?
No. 31 : 21 November — Taking Stock
No. 32 : 5 December — North Africa
No. 33 : 19 December — The Beveridge report

1943
No. 34 : 2 January — The Mediterranean
No. 35 : 16 January — Rumour
No. 36 : 30 January — North African Resources
No. 37 : 13 February — The Nation's health
No. 38 : 27 February — The Middle East and Turkey
No. 39 : 13 March — Spain
No. 40 : 27 March — Latin America
No. 41 : 10 April — Germany's New Order
No. 42 : 24 April — The Colonies
No. 43 : 8 May — Problems in the Pacific
No. 44 : 22 May — Women after the war
No. 45 : 5 June — Social Security
No. 46 : 3 July — Facts about Italy
No. 47 : 17 July — Balkan Background
No. 48 : 31 July — When the Lights go on
No. 49 : 14 August — The trouble with Germans
No. 50 : 28 August — You are going to Europe
No. 51 : 11 September — What about our schools?
No. 52 : 25 September — Transatlantic Soundings
No. 53 : 9 October — Here's Tae Us!
No. 54 : 23 October — What we'll Find in Europe
No. 55 : 6 November — Are we United Nations
No. 56 : 20 November — Building the Post-war Home
No. 57 : 4 December — Farming in Soviet Russia
No. 58 : 18 December — What about France?

1944 Current Affairs
No. 59 : 1 January — You and the Americans
No. 60 : 15 January — Armies of Occupation
No. 61 : 29 January - Woman's Place
No. 62 : 12 February — What we'll Find in Germany
No. 63 : 26 February — This Business of Public Opinion
No. 64 : 11 March — The Yank in Britain
No. 65 : 25 March — What is good food
No. 66 : 8 April — Belgium and Holland
No. 67 : 22 April — How about Japan
No. 68 : 6 May — Partners in Battle
No. 69 : 20 May — The Nazis in Scandinavia
No. 70 : 3 June — Electing the President
No. 71 : 17 June — Work for All
No. 72 : 1 July — So you're going to France
No. 73 : 15 July — Partisan Setting!
No. 74 : 29 July — Friends in Need
No. 75 : 12 August — After the Blitz is Over?
No. 76 : 26 August — Schools for Tomorrow
No. 77 : 9 September — The Japanese Way
No. 78 : 23 September — "Show me the way to go home"
No. 79 : 7 October — Brush-up for civvy street
No. 80 : 21 October — Parisian come-back
No. 81 : 4 November — A Weapon against want
No. 82 : 18 November — What happened at home? (20p.)
No. 83 : 2 December — Fewer children
No. 84 : 16 December — Men from the Dominions
No. 85 : 30 December — The cinema and the public

1945 Current Affairs
No. 86 : 13 January — Japanese purpose
No. 87 : 27 January — What price Peace?
No. 88 : 10 February — Chinese prospect
No. 89 : 24 February — A practical democracy (on New Zealand) (20 p.)
No. 90 : 10 March — The more we are together
No. 91 : 24 March — 'Jolly Swagman'
No. 92 : no details
No. 93 : 21 April — Theirs is the Future
No. 94 : 5 May — On thinking geographically
No. 95 : no details
No. 96 : 2 June — The artist and the public (20 p.)
No. B1 : 21 July — Bridging the Gap
No. B2 : 4 August — A matter of choice (16 p.)
No. 3(B) : 18 August — This business of migration (20 p.)
No. 4(B) : 1 September — The prospect before us (16 p.)
No. 5(B) : 15 September — We all go the same way home (16 p.) 
No. 7(B) : 13 October — Look before you leap! (30 p.) 
No. 108(A) : 17 November — South African Survey
No. 10(B) : 24 November — Hungry World
No. 109(A) : 1 December — Indian Background (20 p.)
No. 110(A) : 15 December — Housing Brief (20 p.)
No. 12(B) : 22 December — Work in hand (20 p.)
No. 112 : 12 January — Burning Issue (20 p.)
No. 117 : no date — "What Manchester thinks to-day..." (20 p.)

Note: Between July and December 1945 ABCA 'Current Affairs' had a 'B'-series in between the normal bi-weekly issue, with a B prefix for the book number.

References

Lists of publications
United Kingdom in World War II-related lists